Bezirk Villach-Land is a district of the state of 
Carinthia in Austria.

Municipalities

Towns (Städte) are indicated in boldface; market towns (Marktgemeinden) in italics; suburbs, hamlets and other subdivisions of a municipality are indicated in small characters.
Arnoldstein (Slov.: Podklošter) (1)
Agoritschach, Arnoldstein, Erlendorf, Gailitz, Greuth, Hart, Hart, Krainberg, Krainegg, Lind, Maglern, Neuhaus an der Gail, Oberthörl, Pessendellach, Pöckau, Radendorf, Riegersdorf, Seltschach, St. Leonhard bei Siebenbrünn, Thörl-Maglern-Greuth, Tschau, Unterthörl
Bad Bleiberg (Slov.: Plejberk pri Beljaku) (2)
Bad Bleiberg, Bleiberg-Kreuth, Bleiberg-Nötsch, Hüttendorf, Kadutschen
Finkenstein am Faaker See (Slov.: Bekštanj) (3)
Altfinkenstein, Faak am See, Finkenstein, Fürnitz, Gödersdorf, Goritschach, Höfling, Kopein, Korpitsch, Latschach, Ledenitzen, Mallenitzen, Müllnern, Neumüllnern, Oberaichwald, Oberferlach, Outschena, Petschnitzen, Pogöriach, Ratnitz, Sigmontitsch, St. Job, Stobitzen, Susalitsch, Techanting, Unteraichwald, Unterferlach, Untergreuth
Nötsch im Gailtal (Slov.: Čajna) (4)
Bach, Dellach, Emmersdorf, Förk, Glabatschach, Hermsberg, Kerschdorf, Kreublach, Kühweg, Labientschach, Michelhofen, Nötsch, Poglantschach, Saak, Semering, St. Georgen im Gailtal, Wertschach
Paternion (Slov.: Špaterjan) (5)
Aifersdorf, Boden, Duel, Ebenwald, Feffernitz, Feistritz an der Drau, Feistritz an der Drau-Neusiedlung, Kamering, Kamering, Kreuzen, Mühlboden, Neu-Feffernitz, Nikelsdorf, Patendorf, Paternion, Pobersach, Pogöriach, Pöllan, Rubland, Tragail, Tragin
Rosegg (Slov.: Rožek) (6)
Berg, Bergl, Buchheim, Dolintschach, Drau, Duel, Emmersdorf, Frög, Frojach, Kleinberg, Obergoritschach, Pirk, Raun, Rosegg, St. Johann, St. Lambrecht, St. Martin, Untergoritschach
Sankt Jakob im Rosental (Slov.: Šentjakob v Rožu) (7)
Dragositschach, Dreilach, Feistritz, Fresnach, Frießnitz, Gorintschach, Greuth, Kanin, Längdorf, Lessach, Maria Elend, Mühlbach, Rosenbach, Schlatten, Srajach, St. Jakob im Rosental, St. Oswald, St. Peter, Tallach, Tösching, Winkl
Treffen (Slov.: Trebinje) (8)
Annenheim, Äußere Einöde, Buchholz, Deutschberg, Eichholz, Görtschach, Innere Einöde, Kanzelhöhe, Köttwein, Kras, Lötschenberg, Niederdorf, Oberdorf, Ossiachberg, Pölling, Retzen, Sattendorf, Schloss Treffen, Seespitz, Stöcklweingarten, Töbring, Treffen, Tschlein, Verditz, Winklern
 Velden am Wörther See (Slov.: Vrba) (9)
Aich, Augsdorf, Bach, Dieschitz, Dröschitz, Duel, Fahrendorf, Göriach, Kantnig, Kerschdorf, Köstenberg, Kranzlhofen, Latschach, Lind ob Velden, Oberdorf, Oberjeserz, Oberwinklern, Pulpitsch, Rajach, Saisserach, Selpritsch, Sonnental, St. Egyden, Sternberg, Treffen, Unterjeserz, Unterwinklern, Velden am Wörther See, Weinzierl, Wurzen
Afritz am See (Slov.: Zobrce) (10)
Afritz, Berg ob Afritz, Gassen, Kraa, Lierzberg, Möderboden, Scherzboden, Tassach, Tauchenberg, Tobitsch
Arriach (Slov.: Arjoh)  (11)
Arriach, Berg ob Arriach, Dreihofen, Hinterbuchholz, Hinterwinkl, Hundsdorf, Innerteuchen, Laastadt, Oberwöllan, Sauboden, Sauerwald, Stadt, Unterwöllan, Vorderwinkl, Waldweg
Feistritz an der Gail (Slov.: Bistrica na Zilji) (12)
Feld am See (Slov.: Obernšec)  (13)
Erlach, Feld am See, Feldpannalpe, Klamberg, Rauth, Schattseite, Untersee, Wiesen
Ferndorf (Slov.: Perja vas) (14)
Beinten, Döbriach, Ferndorf, Glanz, Gschriet, Insberg, Lang, Politzen, Rudersdorf, Sonnwiesen, St. Jakob, St. Paul
Fresach (Slov.: Brežnje) (15)
Amberg, Fresach, Laas, Mitterberg, Mooswald, Tragenwinkel
Hohenthurn (Slov.: Straja vas) (16)
Achomitz, Draschitz, Dreulach, Göriach, Hohenthurn, Stossau
Stockenboi (Slov.: Štokboj) (17)
Aichach, Alberden, Drußnitz, Gassen, Hammergraben, Hochegg, Hollernach, Liesing, Mauthbrücken, Mösel, Ried, Rosental, Scharnitzen, Seetal am Goldeck, Stockenboi, Tragail, Unteralm, Weißenbach, Wiederschwing, Ziebl, Zlan
Weißenstein (Slov.: Bilšak) (18)
Gummern, Kellerberg, Lansach, Lauen, Puch, Stadelbach, Stuben, Töplitsch, Tscheuritsch, Uggowitz, Weißenbach, Weißenstein
Wernberg (Slov.: Vernberg) (19)
Damtschach, Dragnitz, Duel, Föderlach I, Föderlach II, Goritschach, Gottestal, Kaltschach, Kantnig, Kletschach, Krottendorf, Lichtpold, Neudorf, Neudorf, Ragain, Sand, Schleben, Stallhofen, Sternberg, Terlach, Trabenig, Umberg, Wernberg, Wudmath, Zettin

 
Districts of Carinthia (state)